Joseph Samuel Gartner (1912–2002) was an Australian rugby league footballer who played in the 1930s and was a dual premiership winner.

Playing career
Gartner was graded with Newtown in 1931 and went straight into first grade. Gartner was a prolific try scorer during his career and usually played on the wing. He played five seasons with Newtown between 1931 and 1935, which included winning a premiership with them in 1933. He then moved to Canterbury-Bankstown and played six seasons with them between 1936 and 1941. He won a further premiership with Canterbury in 1938 and he scored two tries in that match. He was the father of another Canterbury-Bankstown legend, Ray Gartner.

Gartner died on 1 February 2002, aged 90.

References

1912 births
2002 deaths
Australian rugby league players
Canterbury-Bankstown Bulldogs players
Joe
Newtown Jets players
Rugby league centres
Rugby league players from Sydney